Sherman is a census-designated place (CDP) comprising the central community in the town of Sherman, Fairfield County, Connecticut, United States. It is in the central part of the town, at the north end of Candlewood Lake.

Sherman was first listed as a CDP prior to the 2020 census.

References 

Census-designated places in Fairfield County, Connecticut
Census-designated places in Connecticut